Boris Esmond Collingwood (8 January 1920 at Hither Green, London – 18 November 1968 at Storrington, West Sussex), played first-class cricket in two matches, one each for Cambridge University and Somerset.

A schoolboy first-eleven cricketer at Dulwich College for four seasons before the Second World War and captain in 1939, Collingwood was 28 before the first of his first-class appearances for Cambridge came in the 1948 season. He also played for the university once in a non-first-class match that season.

Five years later, he turned out once for Somerset, at the time a very weak team, in a match at Weston-super-Mare against Nottinghamshire. He made 15 and 1 as Somerset subsided to an innings defeat in two days.

References

1920 births
1968 deaths
English cricketers
Cambridge University cricketers
Somerset cricketers
People educated at Dulwich College
People from the London Borough of Lewisham
People from Storrington